Dudhawa Dam is located in Dhamtari district of Chhattisgarh in India. The construction of the dam began in 1953 and finished in 1964. It is built across the Mahanadi river in the village of Dudhawa, 21 km from Sihawa and 29 km from Kanker. The height of the dam is 24.53 m and the length 2,906.43 m. The reservoir has a catchment area of 625.27 km2. This is one of earthen dams, of which right flank embankment, there is rest house.

References 

Dams in Chhattisgarh
Dams on the Mahanadi River
1964 establishments in Madhya Pradesh
Dams completed in 1964
20th-century architecture in India